Kea is an open-source DHCP server developed by the Internet Systems Consortium, authors of ISC DHCP, also known as DHCPd. Kea and ISC DHCP are both implementations of the Dynamic Host Configuration Protocol, a set of standards established by the Internet Engineering Task Force (IETF). Kea software is distributed in source code form on GitHub, from various ISC sites, and through a number of operating system packages. Kea is licensed under the Mozilla Public License 2.0.

The Kea distribution includes a DHCPv4 server, a DHCPv6 server, and a Dynamic DNS (DDNS) server. Significant features include: support for IPv6 prefix delegation, host reservations (which may be optionally stored in a separate back end database), Preboot Execution Environment (PXE) boot, client classification, shared networks, and high-availability (failover pairs). Kea can store leases locally in a memfile, or in a PostgreSQL, MySQL, or Cassandra database. Kea has a supported API for writing optional extensions, using 'hooks'.

Kea has a graphical management application, called Stork, that integrates an agent running on the Kea server, an exporter to a Prometheus time-series data store, a Grafana template for data visualization, and the Stork web dashboard. Like Kea, Stork is licensed under the MPL 2.0 license. The Stork dashboard provides a simple graphical display for managing one or many Kea servers. Current features include server status, pool utilization, high-availability status, host reservations, and leases per second. Via the integration with Grafana it also provides detailed statistics on DHCP messages over time. Stork is a very new project and features are being added rapidly in monthly releases.

References

External links 
 
 Project repository and issue tracker
 Project repository and issue tracker for Stork management dashboard. 
 Kea documentation on ReadTheDocs
 Stork documentation on ReadTheDocs
 ISC Kea packages

Unix network-related software
Servers (computing)
Free network-related software